Carmen Alardín (5 July 1933 – 10 May 2014) was a Mexican poet. She was known for her poems such as La violencia del otoño (The Violence of Fall) and No pude detener los elefantes (You Can't Detain Elephants). Alardín specialized in German literature. She studied at National Autonomous University of Mexico.

Works
 El canto frágil (1951)
 Pórtico labriego (1953)
 Celda de viento (1957)
 Después del sueño (1960)
 Todo se deja así (1964)
 No puede detener los elefantes (1971)
 Canto para un amor sin fe (1976)
 Entreacto (1982)
 La violencia del otoño (1984)
 La libertad inútil (1992)
 Caracol de río (2000)
 Miradas paralelas (2004)

References

1933 births
2014 deaths
Mexican women poets
20th-century Mexican poets
20th-century Mexican women writers